James C. Clark Jr. (April 24, 1921 – December 7, 2010) was an American professional golfer who played on the PGA Tour in the 1950s and 1960s; and on the Senior PGA Tour in the early 1980s.

A native of Abingdon, Virginia, Clark turned professional in 1946. He won two PGA Tour events, both in 1952. In his first win at the Azalea Open, Clark defeated George Fazio and Jim Turnesa by three strokes with a four-day total of 272 (16-under-par). He was runner-up to Doug Sanders by four strokes at the Greater Greensboro Open in 1963. His best finish in a major was T-33 at the Masters Tournament in 1954.

Clark last played on the Senior Tour in 1983.

Professional wins (2)

PGA Tour wins (2)

PGA Tour playoff record (1–1)

References

External links

American male golfers
PGA Tour golfers
PGA Tour Champions golfers
Golfers from Virginia
People from Abingdon, Virginia
1921 births
2010 deaths